I Wish You L.O.V.E is the fourteenth studio album by American singer Jermaine Jackson featuring David Serero. The album was released in 2012 by Disques DOM, and was his first album in 21 years since You Said in 1991.

Track listing

Personnel
Credits adapted from AllMusic.

Jermaine Jackson - Primary Artist
David Serero - Arranger, Artistic Director, Duet, Producer

References

2012 albums
Jermaine Jackson albums